Pomme de Terre Wildlife Management Area, also referred to as Pomme de Terre WMA, is a  protected area located in Avoyelles Parish, Louisiana owned and managed by the Louisiana Department of Wildlife and Fisheries (LDWF).

Location

Pomme de Terre WMA is located north of LA 1, Simmesport, and the communities of Red Fish and Yellow Bayou (site of the Battle of Yellow Bayou, with access from LA 451 through Hamburg. La 451 makes a semi-circle around the south, east, and north sides of the WMA with Pete Laborde road running north to south on the west side.

Protected areas
The area in southeast-central Louisiana from Simmesport, bounded by LA 1 and LA 114 to Alexandria, LA 28/US 84 to Ferriday and south along the Mississippi River contains the Pomme de Terre WMA (6,434 acres), Spring Bayou Wildlife Management Area (12,506 acres), Grand Cote National Wildlife Refuge (6,077 acres), Dewey W. Wills Wildlife Management Area (63,901 acres), Bayou Cocodrie National Wildlife Refuge (13,200 acres), Richard K. Yancey Wildlife Management Area (69,806 acres), and the Lake Ophelia National Wildlife Refuge (25,000 acres) and totals  of protected land.

Description

Pomme de Terre WMA comprises around 60% open water and marsh areas containing water hyacinth, duckweed, lotus (the nuts are edible and the Cajuns call them "graine à voler"), cutgrass, and buttonbush. The ridges have bald cypress and the overstory consists of scattered Nuttall's oak and overcup oak. There are also hackberry, locust, elm, ash, maple, and sweetgum. Willow is primary in the low lying areas. Box elder and sycamore are also common. The understory consists of haws, deciduous holly, dogwood, elderberry, and seedlings of the overstory. Other understory plants include poison ivy, peppervine, greenbrier, and blackberry.

Restoration
In 1989 the LDWF implemented a restoration project in cooperation with Ducks Unlimited, Inc. The result was two units, that can be operated independently and impacting , utilizing concrete spillways and gated culverts to control water flow and improve hydrology in forested wetlands.

See also

List of Louisiana Wildlife Management Areas

References

Wildlife management areas of the United States
Wildlife management areas of Louisiana
Protected areas of Louisiana
Geography of Avoyelles Parish, Louisiana